The East End Methodist Episcopal Church (East Washington Avenue Methodist Church ; Damascus Spiritual Church) is a historic church at 2401 E. Washington Avenue in North Little Rock, Arkansas.  It is a single-story brick structure, with a broad gable roof and a porch extending across part of its front facade.  It was built in 1922 for a congregation founded in 1915, and is a fine local example of vernacular Craftsman architecture.

The building was listed on the National Register of Historic Places in 2008.

See also
National Register of Historic Places listings in Pulaski County, Arkansas

References

Methodist churches in Arkansas
Churches on the National Register of Historic Places in Arkansas
Churches completed in 1923
Buildings and structures in North Little Rock, Arkansas
Churches in Pulaski County, Arkansas
National Register of Historic Places in Pulaski County, Arkansas